Events from the year 1688 in art.

Events
 Matthias Steinl becomes ivory engraver at the imperial court in Vienna.
 The Equestrian statue of Christian V by French sculptor Abraham-César Lamoureux is unveiled on Kongens Nytorv, Copenhagen.

Paintings

 René-Antoine Houasse – Minerva teaching the Rhodians sculpture (Palace of Versailles)
 Willem van de Velde the Younger – The Fleet at Sea
 Willem van Mieris – A Seated Man

Births
 March 16 – Anna Maria Garthwaite, English textile designer (died 1763)
 April 15 – Johann Georg Bergmüller, Bavarian painter of frescoes, of the Baroque (died 1762)
 April 28 – Giacomo Boni, Italian painter of the late-Baroque period (died 1766)
 May 6 – Charles Parrocel, French painter and engraver and a specialist in battle and hunt paintings (died 1752)
 July 19 – Giuseppe Castiglione, Italian Jesuit Brother, missionary in China, painter at the imperial court (died 1766)
 September 6 – Antonio Corradini, Venetian Rococo sculptor (died 1752)
 September 12 – Ferdinand Brokoff, Bohemian sculptor (died 1731)
 October 29 – Amalia Pachelbel, German painter and engraver (died 1723)
 November 21 – Antonio Visentini, Italian designer, painter and engraver (died 1782)
 date unknown
 Charles-Nicolas Cochin the Elder, French line-engraver (died 1754)
 François Dumont, French sculptor (died 1726)
 Gerolamo Mengozzi Colonna, Italian quadratura painter (died 1774)
 José de Ibarra, Mexican painter (died 1756)
 Ercole Graziani the Younger, Italian painter (died 1765)
 Edme Jeaurat, French engraver (died 1738)
 Louis August le Clerc, French-born sculptor (died 1771)
 François Lemoyne, French Rococo painter (died 1737)
 Francesco Maria Schiaffino, Italian sculptor (died 1763)
 Gao Xiang, Qing Chinese painter, and one of the Eight Eccentrics of Yangzhou (died 1753)

Deaths
 February 11 – Cesare Gennari, Italian painter (born 1641)
 March 9 – Claude Mellan, French engraver and painter (born 1598)
 April 3 – Cosimo Fancelli, Italian sculptor (born 1620)
 October – Philip de Koninck, Dutch landscape painter (born 1619)
 October 13 – Pedro de Mena, Spanish sculptor (born 1628)
 October 14 – Joachim von Sandrart, German art-historian and painter (born 1606)
 December 8 – Thomas Flatman, English poet and miniature painter (born 1635)
 date unknown
 Giovanni Battista Benaschi, Italian painter and engraver active in the late-Renaissance period (born 1636)
 Pedro Atanasio Bocanegra, Spanish painter (born 1638)
 Carlo Cane, Italian painter (born 1618)
 
Years of the 17th century in art
1680s in art